The Rocky Mountain Foothills are an upland area flanking the eastern side of the Rocky Mountains, extending south from the Liard River into Alberta.  Bordering the Interior Plains system, they are part of the Rocky Mountain System or Eastern System of the Western Cordillera of North America.

See also
List of mountain ranges

References

Canadian Rockies
Northern Interior of British Columbia
Hills of British Columbia
Hills of Alberta
Mountain ranges of British Columbia